William McLaughlin   (July 3, 1861 – March 21, 1936) was a Major League Baseball shortstop who played in ten games for the Washington Nationals of the Union Association in 1884. He was a graduate of Sacramento High School.

External links

1861 births
1936 deaths
Major League Baseball shortstops
Baseball players from California
19th-century baseball players
Washington Nationals (UA) players
Sacramento Union players
Boston Blues players
Sacramento Altas players
Savannah (minor league baseball) players